The TaKeTiNa Rhythm Process is musical, meditative group process for people who want to develop their awareness of rhythm. It was developed in the 1970s by the Austrian musician and composer Reinhard Flatischler.

In a TaKeTiNa process, there are three different rhythmic layers—represented by the voice, claps, and steps—that continue simultaneously. Vocalization and clap rhythms, accompanied by the berimbau, constantly change while the steps, supported by a surdo drum, remain the same. The surdo stabilizes the basic rhythm of the steps, while call-and-response singing serves to destabilize and re-stabilize the rhythmic movements. In this process, the simultaneity of stabilization and destabilization creates a disturbance that allows participants to repeatedly fall out, and then fall back into rhythm. Participants are guided into the experience of rhythm archetypes, rhythmic images anchored deep in human consciousness.
According to Flatischler, the support of the group allows the individual participant to go into his or her own process, building deep musical and personal trust.
 
TaKeTiNa is used in academic and clinical settings and in corporate trainings worldwide.

References

Further reading 
 Flatischler, Reinhard. (1992). The Forgotten Power of Rhythm: Taketina. Mendicino, CA: Life Rhythm.
 Flatischler, Reinhard. (2007). Rhythm for Evolution: Das TaKeTiNa-Rhythmusbuch. Mainz, Germany: Schott.
 Peyser, R. (1998). "Primal rhythm - ancient healer: TaKeTiNa with Reinhard Flatischler." [HTML document]. Retrieved December 10, 2007 from the World Wide Web: http://www.randypeyser.com/flatischler.htm
 Peyser, R. (Fall, 2009). TaKeTiNa: Rewiring with rhythm  [HTML document]. Retrieved July 29, 2010 from the World Wide Web: http://issuu.com/consciousdancer/docs/issue_8
 Rothman, T. (2001). "Ta Ke Ti Na - Listening to the Pulse of Life." [WORD document]. Deutschwaldstrasse, Austria: Ta Ke Ti Na Institute. Retrieved December 10, 2007 from the World Wide Web: http://academic.evergreen.edu/curricular/transcendentpractices/allprogram/Winter%20Ta%20Ke%20Ti%20Na.doc
 Toms, J. W. (December, 2007). Cultivating enlightenment. In "New Dimensions Newsletter,"  [HTML document]. Retrieved December 11, 2007 from the World Wide Web:  http://www.ndbroadcasting.org/data/newsletter/200712.html.

External links
 Homepage

Meditation
Music therapy
Rhythm and meter
1970s introductions